Dr Tidi Michael Ejueyitsi (born 15 September 1980) is the 15th and current local government chairman of Warri south local government area, Delta State Nigeria. He was born to Joshua Oritsetimeyin Tidi and late Princess Roli Lizzy Emiko. Tidi Michael was elected on the platform of the Peoples Democratic Party in Delta State, Nigeria.

He is an Itsekiri of Okere, Ode-Itsekiri and Omadino, and Urhobo of Ukpokiti and Igbudu of Agbarah all of Warri South Council Area of Delta State.

Education 
Michael had his primary education at Ikengbuwa primary school Warri, his junior secondary at Yonwuren college Warri and his senior secondary at Brisco Commercial College Warri, Delta State. He later gained admission into the University of Port-Harcourt where he acquired a Bachelor's degree in Economics and further acquired a master's degree in Economics at the Delta State University. His quest for knowledge propelled him to acquire a Phd in Energy studies at the CPEEL (centre for petroleum, energy, economics and law), University of Ibadan with specialization in oil and gas economics.

Work and Career 

On completion of his NYSC in 2006, Tidi Michael joined the "Project deliver Uduaghan" campaign train which was enamored with the task of making sure Dr Emmanuel Uduaghan was voted to be the Governor of Delta State. In 2009 Michael joined DESOPADEC as one of the firms pioneer senior staff but later resigned to run for Warri South 1, Constituency Seat in the Delta State House of Assembly.

Tidi Michael was appointed as Special Assistant [News Media] to the Delta State Governor, His Excellency, Sen. Dr. Ifeanyi Okowa from July 2015. In September 2017 he decided to run for the office of Mayor of the Warri south local government area, Delta State on the platform of the Peoples Democratic Party and he won with a landslide victory.

Marriage and Life 
Tidi Michael got married his wife on 30 November 2008 and they are blessed with two children.

References

External links 
https://www.vanguardngr.com/2019/10/no-ethnic-clash-in-warri-southignore-media-reports-%E2%80%95tidi/
https://www.vanguardngr.com/2018/10/warri-south-lg-boss-tasks-firms-on-devt/
https://www.independent.ng/easter-warri-south-chairman-tidi-sues-for-continuous-peace/
https://www.pmnewsnigeria.com/2019/03/10/pdp-wins-warri-south-constituency-i/
https://www.vanguardngr.com/2019/03/pdp-wins-warri-south-constituency-i/
https://www.vanguardngr.com/2020/01/ethnic-tension-has-reduced-in-oil-rich-warri-%E2%80%95-tidi/
https://www.independent.ng/nulge-polls-tidi-bars-non-staff-from-warri-south-secretariat/
https://freshangleng.com/news/5720-just_in__warri_south_chairman,tidi_bags_phd
https://freshangleng.com/7294/we-gave-okowa-over-34-000-votes--compared-to-about-22-000-of-2015-%E2%80%93-tidi?fb_comment_id=2375618655811328_2375854389121088
https://www.von.gov.ng/pdp-wins-warri-south-constituency/
https://www.vanguardngr.com/2020/01/fake-revenue-agents-infiltrate-warri-council-boss-raises-alarm/
https://www.vanguardngr.com/tag/michael-tidi/
https://freshangleng.com/10237/warri--our-peaceful-narrative-is-making-shell-to-consider-return-tidi

1980 births
Niger Delta Congress politicians
Living people